"No Exit" is a song by the American new wave band Blondie. It was the title track from their seventh studio album in 1999 and was released as a single in Europe, but not the US.

Overview
A "gothic hip hop" track "No Exit" features rapper Coolio exchanging raps with Debbie Harry. It also uses an interpolation of Johann Sebastian Bach's "Toccata and Fugue in D minor" and Edvard Grieg's "In the Hall of the Mountain King".

The single was released in the UK as a special tour souvenir CD. The released CD contains remixes of "No Exit", "Maria", "Nothing Is Real but the Girl" and a cover of Karen Young's 1978 disco hit "Hot Shot".

A video was released for one of the "No Exit" remixes, which also featured rappers Inspectah Deck, U-God of Wu-Tang Clan, Havoc and Prodigy of Mobb Deep as "The Loud Allstars".

Uses in other media
The Loud Allstar Rock Remix was featured in the 1999 film 200 Cigarettes. A music video for the song, featuring the band with Coolio and the other rap performers, was produced in conjunction with the release of the film.

Track listing
All tracks are written by Debbie Harry, Chris Stein, Jimmy Destri, Coolio, Romy Ashby unless otherwise noted

EU CD
 "No Exit" (The Loud Rock Remix Radio Version) - 4:26
 "No Exit" (The Infamous Hip Rock Version Radio Version) -3:21
 "No Exit" (Album Version) - 4:19

UK Exclusive Tour Souvenir CD
 "No Exit" (The Loud Rock Remix Radio Version) - 4:26
 "No Exit" (The Infamous Hip Rock Version Radio Version) - 3:21
 "Maria" (J & B Mix) (Destri) - 4:51
 "Maria" (Talvin Singh Rhythmic Mix) (Destri) - 4:51
 "Nothing Is Real but the Girl" (DT Edit) (Destri) - 3:13
 "Hot Shot" (Andrew Kahn, Kurt Borusiewicz) - 3:46

US 12" (promo only)
 "No Exit" (The Loud Rock Remix) Radio Version - 3:56
 "No Exit" (AMA Performance Version) Radio Version - 4:26
 "No Exit" (The Loud Rock Remix) TV Track - 5:12
 "Who's Gonna Cry" (No Exit Pt. 2, The Infamous Hip Rock Version) Radio Version - 3:21
 "Who's Gonna Cry" (No Exit Pt. 2, The Infamous Hip Rock Version) Instrumental - 3:24
 "Maria (Talvin Singh Rhythmic Radio Edit) (Destri) - 4:39

References

Blondie (band) songs
1999 singles
Songs written by Debbie Harry
Songs written by Chris Stein
Songs written by Jimmy Destri
Song recordings produced by Craig Leon
1999 songs